Wrights Creek is a locality of Sydney, in the state of New South Wales, Australia. It is located in the City of Hawkesbury north-east of Central Macdonald.

Suburbs of Sydney
City of Hawkesbury
Hawkesbury River